Unity is the 16th studio album by the German heavy metal band Rage, released in 2002 by SPV/Steamhammer.

Track listing

Personnel

Band members 
Peter "Peavy" Wagner – vocals, bass
Victor Smolski – guitars
Mike Terrana – drums

Additional musicians 
Hansi Kürsch, D.C. Cooper – backing vocals

Production 
Charlie Bauerfeind – producer, engineering, mixing, mastering

References 

2002 albums
Rage (German band) albums
SPV/Steamhammer albums
Albums produced by Charlie Bauerfeind